The 2018 Africa Magic Viewers' Choice Awards was held 1 September 2018 at Eko Hotel and Suites, Lagos.

Nominees were revealed on June 30, 2018.

Awards

Winners are listed highlighted in boldface.

References

Entertainment events in Nigeria
2018 in Nigerian cinema
Africa Magic
21st century in Lagos
Africa Magic Viewers' Choice Awards ceremonies